Julio Horrego (born 8 October 1998) is a Honduran swimmer. He represented Honduras at the 2019 World Aquatics Championships in Gwangju, South Korea. He competed in the men's 100 metre breaststroke and men's 200 metre individual medley events.

In 2019, he represented Honduras at the Pan American Games held in Lima, Peru.

He represented Honduras at the 2020 Summer Olympics in Tokyo, Japan. He was the flagbearer during the 2020 Summer Olympics Parade of Nations as part of the opening ceremony on 23 July 2021.

He also represented Honduras in the 2021 Short Course World Aquatic Championship in Abu Dhabi, United Emirates where he went on to place 25th in the world.

References 

Living people
1998 births
Place of birth missing (living people)
Honduran male swimmers
Male breaststroke swimmers
Swimmers at the 2019 Pan American Games
Pan American Games competitors for Honduras
Swimmers at the 2020 Summer Olympics
Olympic swimmers of Honduras
21st-century Honduran people